Vladimir Ivanovich Pokhilko (Russian: Владимир Иванович Похилько) (7 April 1954 – 21 September 1998) was a Soviet-Russian entrepreneur. He was an academic who specialized in human–computer interaction.

Early life
Born in Moscow on April 7, 1954, he graduated from the Faculty of Psychology at Moscow State University in 1982. He was a junior researcher at the I.M. Sechenov First Moscow State Medical University.

Psychological experiments using Tetris
A friend of Tetris creator Alexey Pajitnov, he was the first clinical psychologist to conduct experiments using the game. He played an important role in the subsequent development and marketing of the game, and a 1999 article in the Forbes magazine credited him for "co-inventing the seminal videogame Tetris".

Technology company AnimaTek
In 1989, he and Pajitnov founded the 3D software technology company AnimaTek in Moscow. While attempting to create software for INTEC (a company that they started) that would be made for "people's souls", they developed the idea for El-Fish.

Murder-suicide
After suffering financial difficulties at his software company, AnimaTek, Pokhilko allegedly murdered his wife Elena Fedotova (38) and their son Peter (12), by bludgeoning and stabbing them both to death. He then supposedly committed suicide by slitting his own throat. Shortly before his death, Pokhilko penned a note. The police initially did not release the content of the note, saying that it was not a suicide note, and they didn't know who authored it. They later determined it was a purported suicide note and published the content of the note in 1999; it read:

"I've been eaten alive. Vladimir. Just remember that I am exist. The davil. [sic]"

References

External links 
Vladimir Pokhilko seminar abstract and bio on the Stanford University Human-Computer Interaction website.
The Tetris Murders documentary suggesting Vladimir Pokhilko did not commit the murder-suicide. 

1954 births
1998 suicides
Russian video game designers
Murder–suicides in California
Soviet computer scientists
Familicides

Suicides by sharp instrument in the United States
Soviet murderers of children
Russian murderers of children